The 2011 Horizon Laser Vision Center Classic was held from September 30 to October 3 at the Tartan Curling Club in Regina, Saskatchewan as part of the 2011–12 World Curling Tour. The purse for the event was CAD$16,000. The event was held in a triple-knockout format.

Teams

Knockout results

A event

B event

C event

Playoffs

External links

Horizon Laser Vision Center Classic
Horizon Laser Vision Center Classic
Sports competitions in Regina, Saskatchewan
Curling in Saskatchewan
Horizon Laser Vision Center Classic
Horizon Laser Vision Center Classic